Dre & Vidal is a songwriting and production duo consisting of Andre Harris and Vidal Davis, who are best known as the main producers for Jill Scott and Glenn Lewis. Alumni of DJ Jazzy Jeff's A Touch of Jazz production team, Dre & Vidal were also instrumental in the production of Musiq Soulchild's first album.

Since 2004 they have produced several successful hits, including Ciara's "Oh", Usher's "Caught Up" and Chris Brown's "Yo (Excuse Me Miss)". The duo have also worked with Beanie Sigel, 3LW, and Bobby Valentino.

Production discography

 3LW - "Point of No Return", "I Wish"
 Alicia Keys - "So Simple"
 Mario - "Good News Bad News", "Do For Love", "Don't Do It", "Get A Lil More", "I'm Trying To Be Down"  "Missin' My Woman", "Come Back To Me", "Before She Said Hi" feat. Big Sean
 Amerie - "Just Like Me"
 Donell Jones - "Do It All"
 Ludacris - "War With God", "Press the Start Button"
 Fantasia - "Baby Makin' Hips", "I Nominate You"
 Sammie - "What About Your Friend"
 Michael Jackson - "Butterflies"
 Trey Songz - "Store Run"
 Bobby V featuring Fabolous - "Let Him Go"
 Musiq Soulchild - "Love", "One Night", "Girl Next Door"
  Deitrick Haddon - "Where You Are","One Blood", "Soul Survivor
 Destiny's Child - "T-Shirt"
 Floetry - "Ms. Stress", "Sunshine", "Getting Late", "Mr. Messed Up", "Say Yes", "Hello", "Hey You", "Possibilities"
 Marsha Ambrosius - "Your Hands"
 The Game - "Hustler's Dream"
 Jamie Foxx - "Go To Waste"
 Joe - "Perfect Match", "Do It All", "Coulda Been the 1"
 Justin Bieber - "All That Matters", "All Bad", "Change Me", "We Are"
 Kirk Franklin - "Better"
 Ginuwine - "More"
 Macy Gray - "Things That Made Me Change"
 Rico Love - "Ride"
 Mary J. Blige - "Hurt Again", "Can't Hide From Love", "Father In You", "Gotta Be Something More", "Power of Love", "Hold On (featuring Ludacris)", "Give Me Your Love Or Way Down", "Would Have Gave It All", "Healing"
 Chris Brown - "Yo (Excuse Me Miss)","Poppin'", "Hold Up", "Apology"  
 Ciara - "Oh"  
 Mariah Carey - "Clown", "Lullaby"  
 Glenn Lewis - "Lonely", "Is It True", "It's Not Fair", "Don't You Forget It",   
 Monica - "Stop", "Thought You Had My Back"  
 Jill Scott - "Jilltro", "Do You Remember", "Gettin' In The Way", "A Long Walk", "The Way", "Love Rain", "One Is The Magic #", "Show Me", "Easy Conversation", "Free", "One Time", "Sweet Justice", "Nothing (Interlude)", "Rasool", "My Petition", "I Keep", "The Light", "The Real Thing", "Rightness", "Blessed" 
 Ruben Studdard - "After The Candles Burn" 
 Usher - "Caught Up", "Superstar", "Follow Me", "Here I Stand", "Love You Gently", "Hush"
 Charlie Wilson - "Keep It Movin", "Stamina"
 Young Buck - "I'm a Soldier", "Walk with Me"
 The Notorious B.I.G. featuring The Game & Faith Evans - "1970 Somethin'"  
 Donell Jones - "Do It All"
 Ludacris - "War With God", "Press the Start Button"
 Kelly Clarkson - "The Day We Fell Apart"
 Flo Rida - "Shone" featuring Pleasure P
 Robin Thicke - "2 Luv Birds"
 Crystal Aikin - "Lord, You Reign Forever"
 Miguel - "To The Moon", "Hero", "Nothing"
 Lalah Hathaway - "Strong Woman", "Lie To Me"
 Kindred the Family Soul - "Stars", "Alright", "Rightfully So", "No Limit", "The Sheddington (Intro)", "Magic Happen", "Authentically You", "S.O.S. (Sense of Security)", "The Sheddington (Outro)", "Loving The Night", "One Day Soon", "Not Complaining", "Never Loved You More", "Drop The Bomb", "Look At What We Made", "What I've Learned"
 Vivian Green - "Anything Out There", "I'm Not Prepared"
 RichGirl -"Swagger Right"
 Teyana Taylor - "Sorry"

References

External links
 
 
   Le groupe SoulRnB.com consacré à Dre & Vidal

Record producers from Pennsylvania
American hip hop record producers
American songwriting teams
Record production duos
American musical duos